Magic is a psychological horror novel written by William Goldman. It was published in the United States in August 1976 by Delacorte Press.  In 1978 Richard Attenborough directed a feature film adaptation of the story that starred Anthony Hopkins and Ann-Margret.

Plot summary
The novel concerns a man named Corky Withers, a shy, odd-tempered and alcoholic magician, whose lackluster performances start to turn around when he adds a foul-mouthed ventriloquist's dummy, Fats, to the show. It chronicles Corky's childhood and adolescence, and his deep love for a high-school crush named Peggy Ann Snow.

The novel is written kaleidoscopically, changing time period, location, and point of view swiftly and leaving important information, such as the identity of Fats the dummy, unknown for extended periods of time.

Background
Goldman had the idea for a novel about a ventriloquist for a number of years before writing it.

He says his editor suggested he cut the sequence where Corky's father talks about seeing Bronko Nagurski making a comeback in a football game, which Goldman had seen as a boy, but the author refused because he was so moved by it.

Reception
Producer Joseph E. Levine paid $1 million for the film rights and to do the screenplay. The novel was well-received.

Adaptations
 Magic (1978), film directed by Richard Attenborough
 5 Minutes (2018), short film directed by Javan Garza

References

Egan, Sean, William Goldman: The Reluctant Storyteller, Bear Manor Media 2014

External links
 

1976 American novels
American horror novels
Novels by William Goldman
American novels adapted into films
Novels about magic
Novels set in New York (state)
Epistolary novels